{{Infobox election
| election_name = 1892 United States presidential election in Rhode Island
| country = Rhode Island
| flag_year = 1882
| type = presidential
| ongoing = no
| previous_election = 1888 United States presidential election in Rhode Island
| previous_year = 1888
| next_election = 1896 United States presidential election in Rhode Island
| next_year = 1896
| election_date = November 8, 1892
| image_size = x200px
| image1 = Benjamin Harrison 1896.jpg
| nominee1 = Benjamin Harrison
| party1 = Republican Party (United States)
| home_state1 = Indiana
| running_mate1 = Whitelaw Reid
| electoral_vote1 = 4
| popular_vote1 = 26,975
| percentage1 = 50.71%| image2 = StephenGroverCleveland.png
| nominee2 = Grover Cleveland
| party2 = Democratic Party (United States)
| home_state2 = New York
| running_mate2 = Adlai Stevenson I
| electoral_vote2 = 0
| popular_vote2 = 24,336
| percentage2 = 45.75%
| map_image = Rhode Island Presidential Election Results 1892.svg
| map_size = 180px
| map_caption = County ResultsHarrison| title = President
| before_election = Benjamin Harrison
| before_party = Republican Party (United States)
| after_election = Grover Cleveland
| after_party = Democratic Party (United States)
}}

The 1892 United States presidential election in Rhode Island''' took place on November 8, 1892, as part of the 1892 United States presidential election. Voters chose four representatives, or electors to the Electoral College, who voted for president and vice president.

Rhode Island voted for the Republican nominee, incumbent President Benjamin Harrison, over the Democratic nominee, former President Grover Cleveland, who was running for a second, non-consecutive term. Harrison won the state by a narrow margin of 4.96%.

Results

See also
 United States presidential elections in Rhode Island

References

Rhode Island
1892
1892 Rhode Island elections